Meletius III (1772 – 28 November 1845) was the Ecumenical Patriarch of Constantinople in 1845. He was born at the island of Kea in 1772.

1772 births
1845 deaths
19th-century Ecumenical Patriarchs of Constantinople
People from Kea (island)